The 2012 Villanova Wildcats football team represented Villanova University in the 2012 NCAA Division I FCS football season. They were led by 28th-year head coach Andy Talley and played their home games at Villanova Stadium. They are a member of the Colonial Athletic Association (CAA). They finished the season 8–4, 6–2 in CAA play. Due to Old Dominion (7–1 in CAA play) being ineligible for the CAA title, the Wildcats finished in a four-way tie for the CAA championship. They received the CAA's automatic bid into the FCS playoffs where they lost in the first round to Stony Brook.

Schedule

References

Villanova
Villanova Wildcats football seasons
Colonial Athletic Association football champion seasons
Villanova
Villanova Wildcats football